Oscar Garden (21 August 1903 – 2 June 1997) was a New Zealand aviator and horticulturist. He was born in Tongue, Sutherlandshire, Scotland on 21 August 1903. On 16 October 1930, he embarked on a flight from an aerodrome in London, England, to Wyndham Aerodrome in Western Australia. Before the 18-day flight in a second-hand De Havilland Gypsy Moth, he had only 40 hours' solo flying experience. He flew in concert with Mrs Victor Bruce from Jask, Iran, to Rangoon, Burma, part of her record-setting air-sea circumnavigation.

In February 1931, Garden became the first to land a plane on Stewart Island.

In February 2021, 90 years after the historic landing on Stewart Island, there was a re-enactment, but this time in a Tiger Moth. 

Garden went on to become chief pilot, mainly on Short Empire flying boats, and later operations manager for Tasman Empire Airways Ltd, the forerunner to Air New Zealand.

A major feature article "Sundowner of the Skies – Mary Garden takes flight with her father" on his 1930 flight from England to Australia was published in the Australian Financial Review in 2005.

In 2019, Sundowner of the Skies: The Story of Oscar Garden, The Forgotten Aviator was published, written by one of his daughters, Mary Garden. It was shortlisted for the NSW Premier's History Award 2020 for a book of international significance. In 2020, Oscar's youngest daughter Annamaria Aurelia Garden self-published her own book "Oscar Garden: A Tale of One Man’s Love of Flying". One review of the two books noted that it was odd to have two biographies written about the same person from two different familial perspectives, but that they complement each other.

Graeme Hoete, an acclaimed Māori artist, has created a mural of Oscar Garden, now on display at Tauranga Airport, New Zealand. The mural was unveiled on 11 August 2019 with Oscar's daughter Mary and other family members present.

References

1903 births
1997 deaths
New Zealand aviators
New Zealand horticulturists
British emigrants to New Zealand
20th-century New Zealand botanists